The Indian locomotive class WCAM-2 is a class of dual-power AC/DC series electric locomotives that was developed in 1995 by Bharat Heavy Electricals Limited used in the Indian Railways system. They are the second locomotive from the WCAM class. The model name stands for broad gauge (W), DC Current (C), AC Current (A), Mixed traffic (M) locomotive, 2nd generation (2). They entered service in 1995. A total of 20 WCAM-2 were built at BHEL between 1995 and 1996, which made them the most numerous class of mainline dual-power AC-DC electric locomotive. They use the same motors as WCAM 1 but with different circuitry and gearing. They are operational in routes around Mumbai. MU operation was possible with 3 units. WCAM-2P was the passenger-oriented version of the WCAM-2 class. However, they perform better than the WCAM 1 series. Same as WCAM 1 class they also performed poorly in DC mode compared to AC mode. They were also used for hauling trains away from the DC section of suburban trains to AC section and performed the same task as the WCAM-1 did. WCAM-2 locos had the same traction motors, as the WCAM-1 locos, but different circuitry and gearing. The bogies are somewhat different from those of the WCAM-1 being fabricated trimount Co-Co bogies with secondary suspension. Rated speed 105 km/h in DC mode and 120 km/h in AC mode. (In trials by RDSO the loco is said to had been run at speeds up to 135 km/h in AC mode). Almost all of these were dual-braked, but all are now equipped with air brakes only. All the WCAM-1's and -2's were homed at Valsad shed in Gujarat. Many of CR's WCAM-2 locos were not used much in DC zones (exceptions were the CR / Bombay Port Trust's Wadala marshalling yard a portion of which has DC traction, and for hauling the Punjab Mail in the late 1990s) as they delivered very poor performance in DC mode and on CR's heavy grades. Although these locos have the same traction motors as the WAM 4 and WCAM 1, the power output from the WCAM-2 locos is higher than for the WAM-4 and WCAM-1 because in those models the traction motors were underfed (3460kVA transformer in contrast to the 5400kVA transformer for WCAM-2) and did not yield their potential maximum power. Under AC traction, the WCAM-2 locos operate with all six motors in parallel (this has been enforced by modifications to these locos), while in DC mode they also operate in the all-series and series-parallel (2S 3P, i.e., three series-pairs of motors in parallel) configurations. Recent WCAM-2's from BHEL, including the passenger-specific version WCAM-2P, were rated 2916 hp in DC mode and 4715 hp in AC mode (max. speed 120 km/h in AC mode). These were used by WR and CR for fast trains, running at up to 120 km/h. CR had tried the WCAM-2 and WCAM-2P units but found them usable only with speed restrictions. Some WCAM-2P units had only air brakes. With the WCAM-2 locos, MU operation was possible with up to 3 (4?) units. Some (all?) of the WCAM-2 locos were originally leased to IR, ownership remaining with BHEL, the manufacturers.

Technical specifications

Locomotive shed

Trains hauled by WCAM-2/2P 

 Pragati Express
 Sahyadri Express
Jhelum Express
 Kanyakumari Mumbai Express
  Diva- Ratnagiri passenger

See also

Locomotives of India
Rail transport in India
Indian Railways

References

External links

Electric locomotives of India
1500 V DC locomotives
25 kV AC locomotives
5 ft 6 in gauge locomotives
Multi-system locomotives
Co-Co locomotives
BHEL locomotives